Pentosans are polymers composed of pentoses. In contrast to cellulose, which is composed of hexose (glucose) monomers, pentosans are derived from five-carbon sugars such as xylose. Pentosan-rich biomass is the precursor to furfural.

The pentosan content has been determined for many natural materials:
29-25%: oat hulls,	cottonseed hulls, barley, sugarcane bagasse, sunflower husks
24-20% wheat straw, flax shives, hazelnut shells, birchwood, eucalyptus wood
8% pinewood
3% peanut shells

Pentosans can act as heparinoids, glycosaminoglycans which are derivatives of heparin.

They can have an influence on bread quality.

See also 
 Pentosan polysulfate, a semi-synthetic polysulfated xylan sold for the relief of various medical conditions including thrombi and interstitial cystitis in humans and osteoarthritis in dogs and horses

References

External links 
 

Barley
Dietary fiber
Polysaccharides